Domingos is the name of:

People

Surnamed
 Afonso Domingos
 André Domingos
 Antonio Domingos
 Bárbara Domingos
 Camilo Domingos
 Ederson Bruno Domingos
 Garcia Domingos
 Guilherme Afif Domingos
 Jônatas Domingos
 Laila Domingos
 Pedro Domingos
 Raul Domingos
 Wagner Domingos

Given named
 Domingos Caldas Barbosa
 Domingos Chivavele
 Domingos Chohachi Nakamura
 Domingos Correia Arouca
 Domingos Culolo
 Domingos Duarte
 Domingos Duarte Lima
 Domingos Dutra
 Domingos Fernandes Calabar
 Domingos Gomes
 Domingos Gonçalves
 Domingos da Guia
 Domingos Lam
 Domingos Leite Pereira
 Domingos Lopes
 Domingos Mendes
 Domingos Mourão
 Domingos Manuel Njinga
 Domingos Paciência
 Domingos Puglisi
 Domingos Quina
 Domingos Ramos Freitas

 Domingos Simões Pereira
 Domingos de Sousa
 Domingos Jorge Velho
 Domingos Gabriel Wisniewski

See also 

 São Domingos (disambiguation)

 Domingo (name)
Domingo (disambiguation)